Dirk Herman Willem Maas (Dick) (born 15 April 1951) is a Dutch film director, screenwriter, film producer and film composer.

Maas achieved fame after the success of his music videos for the Dutch band Golden Earring, including "Twilight Zone" and the controversial "When the Lady Smiles," and his films De Lift, Amsterdamned and Flodder in the 1980s. Maas also directed the controversial Saint Nicolas slasher Sint (Saint Nick) and one episode of the TV series Young Indiana Jones. The film Karakter won the Academy Award for Best Foreign Language Film in 1998. Maas served as executive producer. The film was produced by his production company First Floor Features, founded in 1984. He left the company, which he started with Laurens Geels, in 2001.

His 2016 film Prooi became an unexpected box office hit in China cinemas in 2019. It is also the first Dutch film to secure a wide theatrical release in China. The film was retitled as Violent Fierce Lion.

An authorized documentary about his career titled De Dick Maas Methode premiered at the Dutch Film Festival on September 27, 2020, in Utrecht.

In 2017 he wrote his first thriller, titled Salvo, followed in the same year by a book in which he wrote about his career as a filmmaker. The Naked Witness is the title of his 2021 book based on his 1988 film Amsterdamned. According to Maas it is the first in a series of books based on this film.

Personal life
Dick Herman Willem Maas was born on 15 April 1951 in Heemstede in the Netherlands.

Maas is married to fellow film director Esmé Lammers, a granddaughter of Max Euwe, World Chess Champion 1935–1937.

Filmography (as director)

Music videos

 1982 – "Twilight Zone" - Golden Earring
 1984 – "Clear Night Moonlight" - Golden Earring
 1984 – "When the Lady Smiles" - Golden Earring
 1988 – "Amsterdamned" - Loïs Lane
 1988 -   " Haunted Guitar " - Billy Falcon
 1989 -   " Turn The World Around " - Golden Earring
 1997 –   "Burning Stuntman" - Golden Earring
 1997 -   " Dance in the Light " - Mai Tai
 2003 -   " Afscheid Nemen Bestaat Niet " - Marco Borsato
 2004 -   " Laat me Gaan " - Marco Borsato

Shorts
 Historia Morbi - 1974
 Picknick'''- 1975
 Adelbert - 1977
 Bon Bon - 1979
 Onder De Maat - 1979
 Overval - 1979
 Idylle - 1979
 Rigor Mortis - 1980
 Long Distance - 2003

Features
 1983 – De Lift 1986 – Flodder 1988 – Amsterdamned 1992 – Flodder in America (aka Flodder 2)
 1995 – Flodder 3 1999 – Do Not Disturb
 2001 – Down
 2007 – Moordwijven 2010 – Sint 2012 – Quiz 2016 – Prooi/Violent Fierce Lion''

References

External links
 

1951 births
Living people
Dutch film directors
Dutch film producers
Dutch satirists
Horror film directors
People from Heemstede
Golden Calf winners
Dutch music video directors